Stollberg is a town in Saxony, Germany.

Stollberg may also refer to:

Stollberg (Amt), a former municipal confederation in Schleswig-Holstein, Germany
Stollberg (North Frisia), a hill of Schleswig-Holstein, Germany
Stollberg (district), a former district in the Free State of Saxony, Germany

See also
 Stolberg (disambiguation)